Financial betting refers to the wagering on the price development of a financial instrument at some later date relative to the current price or level of the instrument, against odds offered by a bookmaker. Maximum potential pay-off of the wager is known when the bet is taken and as a corollary risk is known beforehand by being limited to the initial stake.

Financial betting instruments are a type of digital option. The outcome of the wager at settlement is binary, that is, either a win or a loss. Settlement is executed in cash and there is no delivery of the underlying asset. At any point in time prior to the settlement date bets can often be sold, allowing for possibilities to bet on the accuracy of a market move within the fixed limits of zero win (loss of the stake) and maximum potential win. A fee might sometimes be charged for this service.

The main difference between financial betting and speculation on financial markets using products such as financial spread betting is that the bet must result in a simple binary win or loss based on an event on the underlying financial instruments.  This triggers a fixed payout for a win, while with spread betting the payout or loss varies with the price level of the underlying instrument.

Basis in financial theory 

Odds have to be consistent with the real-time pricing of the underlying financial instruments listed on foreign exchange markets or securities exchanges in order to avoid arbitrage opportunities (although this might not be possible because of limitations on shorting, i.e. laying bets). Calculation of the odds therefore draws on the Black–Scholes formula for pricing options. Using some variation of the model to solve for volatility, from observed market prices of traded options, gives implied volatility. Implied volatility is forward looking, that is, it can be used to estimate the odds for future price movements using mathematical algorithms.

Types of financial betting 

There are three main variations of financial betting. These vary mainly in the way odds are displayed.

 Fixed odds financial betting
 Floating odds financial betting
 Binary betting

Fixed and floating odds betting 
Within financial floating odds the odds change for a given strike price as the price of the underlying changes. The floating odds company calculates odds for different strikes and how much can be won upon settlement depends on how much is bet at those odds.

Within financial fixed odds betting the odds are fixed, while the strike price where a win is achieved relative the current level changes. The fixed odds company will calculate how much has to be bet to win a certain amount upon settlement if the conditions of the prediction become true.

Binary betting 
Binary betting displays odds as an index from 0 to 100 where the bet settles at 100 if the event happens and 0 if it does not. An amount is wagered per point on the index. The event can be bought or sold, making it possible to profit both from the event occurring or not occurring.

Features 

A central feature of financial betting is the fixed risk nature which allows market participants to limit the risk to a known amount. When one opens a bet (long or short) they know beforehand what risk they are taking. What is important here is that you can exit your bet at any time before settlement thus you have an option of minimizing the risk even further. The same can be applied to the winning bets (you can collect the win before the settlement time).

Liquidity is always provided and is achieved by the bookmaker acting as a market maker, always being willing to sell bets to a buyer, and in the case it is permitted, to buy bets back from a participant wanting to sell the bet before it expires. 

A central feature of financial betting is leverage. The benefit of leverage to the participant is that it allows a greater percentage change in capital than if it were invested directly in the underlying asset. This makes financial betting less capital intensive than trading directly on securities exchanges.

See also 
 Arbitrage betting
 Spread betting
 Contract for difference
 Bucket shop (stock market)
 Sports betting

References 

 Andy Richardson, Financial Betting Reference Site 
 Financial betting explained, Financial Betting Reference Site
 เว็บแทงบอลที่ดีที่สุด 
Wagering
Financial markets
Gambling terminology